Cardoso may refer to:

 Cardoso (surname), a Portuguese surname
 Cardoso, São Paulo, municipality in the state of São Paulo, Brazil
 Cardoso (footballer, born 1943), Joaquim Cardoso Neto, Brazilian football midfielder
 Cardoso (footballer, born 1984), Carlos Alexandre Cardos, Brazilian football defender
 Cardoso (footballer, born 1997), Johnatan Cardoso Dias, Brazilian football forward

See also 
 Cardozo (disambiguation)